Health in Qatar has undergone significant improvement in the last several decades as a result of substantial investments in healthcare by the government. Child mortalities have been reduced by over fifty percent since the 1990s. Qatar's healthcare spending is among the highest in the Middle East, with $4.7 billion being invested in healthcare in 2014. The country's progress in health is hampered by exceedingly high rates of obesity, diabetes and genetic disorders.

Currently, health coverage is nationwide. In 2013, the infant mortality rate was 7 per 1,000 live births and life expectancy was 79 years.

The population
The population of 2.3 million is 75% male and 94% are immigrants.  There are about 250,000 Qatari citizens with an average income of about US$94,000 per annum in 2014.

Health concerns

Obesity
In 1980, Qatar was the fourth most obese nation in the world. A recent report conducted in 2013 concluded that Qatar ranks fifth globally in terms of obesity rates. The same report revealed that 22.1% of girls under 20 and 33.5% of boys under 20 are classified as obese.

36.5% of boys and 23.6% of girls age 12–17 were overweight in 2003. By 2015, it was predicted that 73% of women and 69% of men will be obese.  According to the International Association for the Study of Obesity, Qatar has the 6th highest rate of obesity among boys in the Middle East and North Africa region.  

One reason for the obesity trend is the lack of exercise and poorly designed pedestrian friendly cities. "Like other oil-rich nations, Qatar has leaped across decades of development in a short time, leaving behind the physically demanding life of the desert for air-conditioned comfort, servants, and fast food". Although the type of food eaten has changed, the cultural traditions surrounding food have not. Food is often consumed communally, making it nearly impossible to ensure proper portions. A person who does not eat when food is offered is seen as offensive and shameful. It is also normal within Qatari society to be obese.

Diabetes

The country has among the highest rates of obesity, diabetes and genetic disorders in the world. It has the highest rate of obesity among boys in the MENA region.

As of 2013, 16% of the adult population in Qatar have been diagnosed with diabetes. The government has launched numerous campaigns and initiatives to combat the rise in diabetes; the establishment of the Qatar Diabetes Association being one of its most notable initiatives.

Birth defects
According to March of Dimes's global report on birth defects published in 2006, Qatar ranked in the top 20 countries globally for the number of birth defects per 1,000 births. The rate stands at 73.4 per 10,000 live births. According to March of Dimes, Qatar ranked 16th globally for the number of birth defects per 1,000 births; this is due to the high degree of consanguinity in marriages.

See also
 Healthcare in Qatar
 List of countries by Body Mass Index (BMI)

References